Fires of Fate is a 1932 British adventure film directed by Norman Walker and starring Lester Matthews, Kathleen O'Regan and Dorothy Bartlam. It was adapted from the 1909 play Fires of Fate by Arthur Conan Doyle which was in turn based on his 1898 novel The Tragedy of the Korosko.

Cast
 Lester Matthews as Lt. Col Egerton 
 Kathleen O'Regan as Nora Belmont 
 Dorothy Bartlam as Kay Byrne 
 Jean Cadell as Miss Byrne 
 Donald Calthrop as Sir William Royden 
 Hubert Harben as Rev. Mark Royden 
 Clifford Heatherley sa Abdullah 
 Arthur Chesney as Mr. Braddell 
 Jack Raine as Filbert Frayne 
 Garry Marsh as Captain Archer

References

External links

1932 films
1932 adventure films
British adventure films
Films shot at British International Pictures Studios
1930s English-language films
Films directed by Norman Walker
Films based on works by Arthur Conan Doyle
Films based on British novels
British films based on plays
Films set in Egypt
British black-and-white films
Films based on adaptations
1930s British films